Let Love Rain on Me is an EP by German hard rock singer Doro Pesch, released in 2004 through AFM Records. It is an enhanced CD containing both musical tracks and a live video. The title track is present in three versions sung in English, Spanish and French. "Let Love Rain on Me", the Judas Priest cover "Breaking the Law" and the Warlock song "I Rule the Ruins" were played acoustically with a full orchestra and are featured in the following album Classic Diamonds in slightly different versions.

The EP reached position No. 65 in the German Singles chart and position No. 7 in the Spanish Singles chart.

Track listing

Personnel
Doro Pesch – vocals

The Classic Night Orchestra on tracks 1-5
Arnt Böhme – conductor, orchestral arrangements
Hye-sin Tjo, Ardan Saguner, Nonna Parfenov, Elda Teqja, Marco Stankovic, Ingrid Illguth – first violins
Carolin Kosa, Arhan Saguner, Emma Fridman, Jee-eun Lee, Alexander Schneider – second violins
Wiebke Corssen, Urs Beckers, Kristina Iczque, Manuela Crespi –  violas
Lev Gordin (soloist), Martin Henneken, Jens Peter Jandausch, Luise Schroeter – violoncellos
Milivoj Plavsic – contrabass
Daniel Edelhoff, Jörg Brohm – first trumpets
Wolfgang Mundt, Carsten Gronwald – second trumpets
Andreas Roth, Peter Schatlo – trombones
Jan Böhme – bass trombone
Klaus 'Major' Heuser – acoustic guitars
Wolf Simon – drums
Mario Arrangonda – percussion

Additional musicians on track 6
Joe Taylor – acoustic guitar
Nick Douglas – bass
Johnny Dee – drums

References

Doro (musician) EPs
2004 EPs
AFM Records EPs